Michael Sexton (born 1971) is an  Australian footballer.

Michael Sexton may also refer to:

Michael H. Sexton (1863–1937), American baseball executive
Mike Sexton (1947–2020), American poker player
Michael Sexton, president of Trump University
Michael Sexton (lawyer)